Stop Pretending is a studio album by the American garage punk band the Pandoras, released in 1986 by Rhino Records.

Critical reception
Trouser Press wrote: "While maintaining the ’60s fixation and playing up the brash-hussy stance, Stop Pretending features stronger playing and a harder-rocking edge (there’s no reason why 'In and Out of My Life (In a Day)' shouldn’t have been a hit), suggesting that the Pandoras aren’t as hopelessly mired in historical fetishism as one might assume." 

The Washington Post thought that "it's simply more interesting and even more modern when an all-female band adopts the aggressive punk stance and angry sound that was once the exclusive signature of male frustration and rebellion." The Los Angeles Times wrote that "[Paula] Pierce's vocals are uneven and the songs are more duplication than inspiration, but Stop Pretending effectively plays tough with stereotypes about '60s bands and girl bands, putting Pierce and her cohorts on top-which seems to be the position they prefer." The New York Times opined that "the musicianship is rough, and the album production ... suffers from its low budget like many independent label releases."

Track listing
All songs written by Paula Pierce unless otherwise noted.

Side one
"In and Out of My Life (In a Day)"
"I Didn't Cry"
"Anyone but You" 
"You're All Talk"
"That's Your Way Out" 
"You Don't Satisfy"

Side two
"Let's Do Right}" 
"I'm Your Girl "
"That's The Way It's Going to Be"
"Stop Pretending"
"Ain’t Got No Soul" (Gary Fausz, Jim Geyer)
"It Felt Alright"

2003 bonus tracks
"The Hump" (Herb Gross)
"I Want My Caveman"
"You Burn Me Up and Down" (Demo Version)
"Bad Seed" (Demo Version)
"She's Ugly" (Demo Version)
"Love Them, Leave Them" (Demo Version)
"Something I Can't Have" (Demo Version)
"You Don't Know" (Demo Version)
"Never Get Enough" (Demo Version)
"In and Out of My Life (In a Day)" (Demo Version)

Personnel

 Lead Vocals, Guitar – Paula Pierce
 Bass, Vocals – Kim Shattuck
 Keyboards, Vocals – Melanie Vammen
 Drums, Vocals – Karen Blankfeld
 Art Direction – Don Brown 
 Design – Grace Amemiya
 Engineer – Dan Matovina
 Lacquer Cut By – KP
 Management – Backlash Enterprises, Inc., Randall Wixen
 Mixed By – Bill, Dan
 Photography By – Eric Stein
 Producer – Bill Inglot

References

1986 albums
The Pandoras albums
Rhino Records albums